Crazy World Tour Live... Berlin 1991 is a 1991 live video by German band Scorpions. The concert was recorded in Berlin, Germany.

 "Bad Boys Running Wild"
 "Hit Between the Eyes"
 "Tease Me Please Me" (VideoClip)
 "I Can't Explain"
 "The Zoo"
 "Don't Believe Her" (VideoClip)
 "Rhythm of Love"
 "Crazy World"
 "Can‘t Live Without You"
 "Blackout"
 "Dynamite"
 "Lust or Love"
 "Send Me an Angel" (VideoClip)
 "Big City Nights"
 "Rock You Like a Hurricane"
 "Wind of Change" (VideoClip)

Personnel 
 Klaus Meine – lead and backing vocals
 Rudolf Schenker – rhythm and lead guitars, acoustic guitar, backing vocals
 Matthias Jabs – lead and rhythm guitars, acoustic guitar, voice-box
 Francis Buchholz – bass
 Herman Rarebell – drums

References

External links
Crazy World Tour Live release

Scorpions (band) video albums
1991 video albums
PolyGram video albums